Shad Milarzan (also Romanized as Shād Mīlarzān; also known as Shāh Mīlarzān, Terbah, and Tūrbah) is a village in Khotbeh Sara Rural District, Kargan Rud District, Talesh County, Gilan Province, Iran. At the 2006 census, its population was 201, in 43 families.

References 

Populated places in Talesh County